The 1953 NCAA Golf Championship was the 15th annual NCAA-sanctioned golf tournament to determine the individual and team national champions of men's collegiate golf in the United States.

The tournament was held at The Broadmoor in Colorado Springs, Colorado.

Stanford won the team title, the Indians' sixth NCAA team national title.

Individual results

Individual champion
 Earl Moeller, Oklahoma A&M

Tournament medalist
 Merle Backlund, Colorado (137)

Team results

Note: Top 10 only
DC = Defending champions

References

NCAA Men's Golf Championship
Golf in Colorado
NCAA Golf Championship
NCAA Golf Championship
NCAA Golf Championship